The Tsakhur or Caxur people are a Lezgin sub-ethnic group of northern Azerbaijan and southern Dagestan (Russia). The group numbers around 30,000 people and are called yiqy (pl. yiqby), but are generally known by the name Tsakhur, which derives from the name of a Dagestani village, where they make up the majority.

History
The Tsakhurs are first mentioned in 7th-century Armenian and Georgian sources where they are named Tsakhaik. After the conquest of Caucasian Albania by the Arabs, Tsakhurs formed a semi-independent state (later a sultanate) of Tsuketi and southwestern Dagestan. By the 11th century, Tsakhurs who had mostly been Christian, converted to Islam. From the 15th century some began moving south across the mountains to what is now the Zaqatala District of Azerbaijan. In the 18th century the capital of the state moved south from Tsakhur in Dagestan to İlisu and came to be called the Elisu Sultanate. West of the Sultanate Tsakhurs formed the Djaro-Belokani free communities. The sultanate was in the sphere of influence of the Shaki Khanate. It became part of the Russian Empire by the beginning of the 19th century.

Geography
Tsakhurs live in Azerbaijan's Zaqatala region, where they make up 14% of the population, and in Gakh, where they constitute less than 2%. In Dagestan, they live in the mountainous parts of the Rutulsky district. According to Wolfgang Schulze, there are 9 villages in Azerbaijan, where Tsakhurs make up the majority of the population, all of them in Zaqatala. 13 more villages in Zaqatala and Gakh have a significant Tsakhur minority.

Culture 
The main traditional occupation of the Tsakhurs include raising sheep, which is the most important part of their economy. However, Tsakhurs are also known for their skills as stonemasons, tailors, carpenters, and makers of handicrafts (which includes carpet-weaving and knitting).

Language
Most Tsakhurs speak the Tsakhur language as their native language. The rate of bilingualism in Tsakhur and Azeri is high. Other languages popular among Tsakhurs include Russian and Lezgian.

References

External links
 http://geo.ya.com/travelimages/az-tsakhur.html 
 Shakasana (site maintained by Tsakhur about their language, culture, history, etc.)

Lezgins
Ethnic groups in Azerbaijan
Ethnic groups in Dagestan
Muslim communities of Russia
Peoples of the Caucasus
Muslim communities of the Caucasus